Kuban Krasnodar is a multi-sport club based in Krasnodar, Russia.

Composition
FC Kuban Krasnodar - football club
HC Kuban Krasnodar - women's handball club
HC Kuban - ice hockey club (known as Kuban Krasnodar)
RC Kuban - rugby union club (known as Kuban Krasnodar)

See also
Kuban (disambiguation)

Multi-sport clubs in Russia